Heart of Men (Reissued in Nollywood as Forbidden Fruit by Henrikesim Multimedia Concept for International distribution) is a 2009 Ghanaian Nigerian thriller film produced & directed by Frank Rajah Arase, and starring Majid Michel, John Dumelo, Prince David Osei and Yvonne Nelson. It received five nominations at the 6th Africa Movie Academy Awards.

Cast
Majid Michel as Richie
John Dumelo as Kay
Prince David Osei as Ray
Yvonne Nelson as Tracy
Martha Ankomah as Diana
Kofi Adjorlolo as Bernard
Gavivina Tamakloe as Officer
Nadia Buari as Sylvia
Luckie Lawson as Alicie
Jackie Appiah as Whitney
Jackie Appiah as Adline

Reception 
The film was generally criticized for promoting nudity in films and introducing soft porn to Nigerian and Ghanaian home videos.

It is rated 3 out of 5 stars on Nollywood Reinvented who praised the quality, setting and musical score, but found the plot too complex and the sex scenes overdone.

See also
 List of Nigerian films of 2009

References

2009 films
Nigerian thriller drama films
Ghanaian drama films
2009 direct-to-video films
2009 thriller films
English-language Nigerian films
English-language Ghanaian films
2000s English-language films